The 125th Pennsylvania House of Representatives District is located in Dauphin County and Schuylkill County and includes the following areas:
 Dauphin County
 Berrysburg
 Elizabethville
 Gratz
 Lykens
 Lykens Township
 Mifflin Township
 Pillow
 Washington Township
 Wiconisco Township
 Williamstown
 Williams Township
 Schuylkill County
 Auburn
 Barry Township
 Cressona
 Eldred Township
 Frailey Township
 Hegins Township
 Schuylkill County (continued)
 Hubley Township
 Landingville
 North Manheim Township
 Norwegian Township
 Pine Grove
 Pine Grove Township
 Porter Township
 Pottsville (PART)
 Ward 03
 Ward 07
 Schuylkill Haven
 South Manheim Township
 Tower City
 Tremont
 Tremont Township
 Upper Mahantongo Township
 Washington Township
 Wayne Township

Representatives

References

Government of Dauphin County, Pennsylvania
Government of Schuylkill County, Pennsylvania
125